Forty Mile Colony is a Hutterite colony and census-designated place (CDP) in Big Horn County, Montana, United States, within the Crow Indian Reservation. It is in the valley of the Little Bighorn River, 
 south of the town of Lodge Grass.

The location was first listed as a CDP prior to the 2020 census.

Demographics

References 

Census-designated places in Big Horn County, Montana
Census-designated places in Montana
Hutterite communities in the United States